Choy Hiu Fung (born 17 January 1996) is a Hong Kong road cyclist, who currently rides for UCI Continental team .

Major results
2013
 National Junior Road Championships
2nd Time trial
3rd Road race
2017
 9th Overall Tour of Fuzhou
2020
 Cambodia Bay Cycling Tour
1st Mountains classification
1st Stage 2

References

External links

1996 births
Living people
Hong Kong male cyclists
Cyclists at the 2018 Asian Games
Asian Games competitors for Hong Kong
Olympic cyclists of Hong Kong
Cyclists at the 2020 Summer Olympics